The 2017–18 Armenian Premier League season was the 26th since its establishment. The season began in August 2017 and concluded in May 2018. Alashkert were the defending champions from the previous season.

Teams
The same six teams from the previous season will also take part in this season's competition.

 1Gandzasar Kapan played the 1st half of the season at Vazgen Sargsyan Stadium in Yerevan, due to the rebuilding of their Gandzasar Stadium, Kapan, while they used other available Premier League stadiums during the 2nd half of the season.

Personnel and sponsorship

1. Left the team at the end of the 1st half of the season (after matchday 15).
2. Became captain after joining the club at the beginning of the 2nd half of the season (after matchday 15).

Season Events
On 19 May 2018, the Football Federation of Armenia upheld its decision to deduct 12 points from Shirak, and fine the club Seven Million Drams, after it was alleged that Shirak's sporting director Ararat Harutyunyan had offered Edward Kpodo of FC Banants a bribe to fix their upcoming match.

League table

Results
The six teams will play each other six times, three times at home and three times away, for a total of 30 matches per team played.

Season statistics

Top scorers

References

External links

 Soccerway
 UEFA

Armenian Premier League seasons
Arm
1